"I Will Always Love You" is a song written and originally recorded in 1973 by American singer-songwriter Dolly Parton. Written as a farewell to her business partner and mentor Porter Wagoner, expressing Parton's decision to pursue a solo career, the country single was released in 1974. The song was a commercial success for Parton, twice reaching the top spot of Billboard Hot Country Songs: first in June 1974, then again in October 1982, with a re-recording for The Best Little Whorehouse in Texas soundtrack.

Whitney Houston recorded a soul-ballad arrangement of the song for the 1992 film The Bodyguard. Houston's version peaked at number one on the Billboard Hot 100 for a then-record-breaking 14 weeks. The single was certified diamond by the RIAA, making Houston's first diamond single, the third female artist who had both a diamond single and a diamond album, and becoming the best-selling single by a woman in the U.S. The song was a global success, topping the charts in almost all countries. With over 20 million copies sold, it became the best-selling single of all time by a female solo artist. Houston won the Grammy Award for Record of the Year in 1994 for "I Will Always Love You".

The song has been recorded by many other artists including Linda Ronstadt, John Doe, Amber Riley, LeAnn Rimes, and Sarah Washington, whose dance version reached number 12 on the UK Singles Chart.
I Will Always Love You has been recognized by BMI for over ten million broadcast performances.

Background and composition

Country music singer-songwriter Dolly Parton wrote the song in 1973 for her one-time partner and mentor Porter Wagoner, from whom she was separating professionally after a seven-year partnership. She recorded it in RCA Studio B in Nashville on June 12, 1973.

Author Curtis W. Ellison stated that the song "speaks about the breakup of a relationship between a man and a woman that does not descend into unremitting domestic turmoil, but instead envisions parting with respect – because of the initiative of the woman". The country love track is set in a time signature of common time with a tempo of 66 beats per minute. (Larghetto/Adagio) Although Parton found much success with the song, many people are unaware of its origin; during an interview, Parton's manager Danny Nozel said that "one thing we found out from American Idol is that most people don't know that Dolly Parton wrote [the track]". During an interview on The Bobby Bones Show, Dolly Parton revealed that she wrote her signature song "Jolene" on the same day that she wrote "I Will Always Love You."

Several times (long before Whitney Houston recorded the song), Dolly Parton suggested to singer Patti LaBelle that she record "I Will Always Love You" because she felt LaBelle could have sung it so well. However, LaBelle admitted she kept putting off the opportunity to do so and later deeply regretted it after she heard Whitney Houston's rendition.

1974 version
"I Will Always Love You" was issued on March 18, 1974, as the second single from Parton's thirteenth solo studio album, Jolene (1974). During its original release in 1974, "I Will Always Love You" reached number four in Canada on the Canadian RPM Country Tracks chart and peaked at number one on the Billboard Hot Country Songs chart, becoming one of the best selling singles of 1974.

When the 1974 recording of the song reached number one on the country charts, Elvis Presley indicated that he wanted to cover the song. Parton was interested until Presley's manager, Colonel Tom Parker, told her that it was standard procedure for the songwriter to sign over half of the publishing rights to any song Elvis recorded. Parton refused. She recalls:I said, 'I'm really sorry,' and I cried all night. I mean, it was like the worst thing. You know, it's like, Oh, my God… Elvis Presley.' And other people were saying, 'You're nuts. It's Elvis Presley.' …I said, 'I can't do that. Something in my heart says, 'Don't do that. And I just didn't do it… He would have killed it. But anyway, so he didn't. Then when Whitney [Houston's version] came out, I made enough money to buy Graceland.

The song won Parton Female Vocalist of the Year at the 1975 CMA Awards.

Critical reception
In Curtis W. Ellison's book, Country Music Culture: From Hard Times to Heaven (1995), he stated: "In the early 1990s, when ambiguity in romantic relationships accompanies changing expectations for both men and women, this song demonstrates Dolly Parton's appeal as a songwriter in the pop music market." Ken Knight, author of The Midnight Show: Late Night Cable-TV "Guy-Flicks" of the '80s (2008), commented that Parton is the only singer who can sing "I Will Always Love You" and "make it memorable". Writer Paul Simpson criticized the singer, stating that the track was only written to "soften the blow" of Parton and Wagoner's split.

Track listing
 7" vinyl
 "I Will Always Love You" – 2:53
 "Lonely Comin' Down" – 3:09

Credits and personnel

 Dolly Parton – vocals, guitar
 Jimmy Colvard – guitar
 Chip Young – guitar
 Stu Basore – pedal steel guitar
 Bobby Dyson – bass
 Larrie Londin – drums
 Buck Trent – banjo
 Bobby Thompson – banjo
 Mack Magaha – fiddle
 Johnny Gimble – fiddle
 Hargus "Pig" Robbins – piano
 Dolores Edgin – background vocals
 Hershel Winginton – background vocals
 Joe Babcock – background vocals
 June Page – background vocals

Charts
Weekly

Year-End

1982 version

Parton re-recorded the song for The Best Little Whorehouse in Texas, released July 12, 1982, as the first single from the soundtrack album. The single eventually hit number one on the Billboard Hot Country Singles chart, earning Parton a rare distinction: reaching the number one position twice with the same song.

Critical reception
Billboard gave a positive review which said, "The first single from The Best Little Whorehouse in Texas isn't the sort of brassy main theme normally used to launch a major movie musical: here Parton reinterprets one of her earliest exercises in pure pop writing, and while older fans may be divided over the breathier, more stylized reading she offers here, the song itself is still a lovely ballad with a soaring chorus."

Cashbox also reviewed the single favorably, saying that "hoisted over a building arrangement, Parton's vocals have never been more convincing or moving. The single choice from her Hollywood flick, The Best Little Whorehouse in Texas, the tune is sentiment wrapped in an appropriate package replete with strings, oboe and harp in addition to a delicate rhythm section."

Charts

Certifications

1995 version

Parton recorded "I Will Always Love You" in 1995 as a duet with Vince Gill for her album, Something Special. Following an August 26 performance of the duet at the Grand Ole Opry which aired on TNN, radio stations began giving the duet unsolicited airplay, causing it to debut on the Billboard Hot Country Singles & Tracks chart at number 53. After a performance at the 29th Annual CMA Awards, the song was officially released as a single in November 1995, peaking at number 15. This marked the third time Parton had a top 20 hit with the song. The song was nominated at the 38th Annual Grammy Awards for Best Country Collaboration with Vocals and was named Vocal Event of the Year at the 30th Annual CMA Awards.

Personnel
Adapted from the album liner notes.
 Assa Dormi – concertmaster
 Paul Franklin – steel
 Vince Gill – duet vocals
 Owen Hale – drums
 David Hungate – bass
 Brent Mason – guitar
 Terry McMillan – percussion
 Dale Oehler – string arrangements, conductor
 Dolly Parton – lead vocals
 Matt Rollings – piano
 Brent Rowan – guitar

Charts

Whitney Houston version

Background
In 1992, American singer Whitney Houston recorded a new arrangement of "I Will Always Love You" for the soundtrack to The Bodyguard, her film debut. The song has a saxophone solo by Kirk Whalum. She was originally to record Jimmy Ruffin's "What Becomes of the Brokenhearted" as the lead single from The Bodyguard. However, when it was discovered the song was to be used for Fried Green Tomatoes, Houston requested a different song. It was her co-star Kevin Costner who suggested "I Will Always Love You", playing her Linda Ronstadt's 1975 version from her album Prisoner in Disguise. Producer David Foster and Houston re-arranged the song as a soul ballad. Her record company did not feel a song with an a cappella introduction would be as successful; however, Houston and Costner insisted on retaining it. When Parton heard that Houston was using Ronstadt's recording as a template, she called Foster to give him the final verse, which was missing from the Ronstadt recording, as she felt it was important to the song. Houston's rendition of the song was issued as the soundtrack's leading single on November 3, 1992, by Arista Records.

Houston's recording is not the only version of the song featured in the film. In a scene where she dances with Costner, a version by John Doe can be heard playing on a jukebox.

Houston's version appears at No. 8 on NMEs Greatest No 1 Singles in History list. In 2004, Houston's version of "I Will Always Love You" placed at number 65 on AFI's 100 Years...100 Songs survey of top tunes in American cinema. It was also ranked at number 22 on The Guardians list of Britain's favorite 100 songs, published in May 2002. , Houston's version of "I Will Always Love You" has sold over 20 million copies worldwide, making it the best-selling single by a female artist of all time as well as one of the best-selling singles of all time.

In February 2014, the song placed at number six on Billboards list of the Top 50 'Love' Songs of All Time. A live performance was included on the 1999 release Divas Live '99, and a 1994 performance of the song was included on the 2014 CD/DVD release of Whitney Houston Live: Her Greatest Performances. The song is also included in the soundtrack to the 2013 film This Is the End and the opening to 2019's Spider-Man: Far From Home.

Critical reception
Houston's cover of "I Will Always Love You" received widespread acclaim from music critics, being now regarded as one of her "signature'' songs. Larry Flick of Billboard wrote that the song is "bolstered by a remarkably restrained (and ultimately effective) vocal by Houston. She builds to dramatic, heartfelt conclusion that makes sense, given the unusually slow-building created by producer David Foster." Randy Clark of Cashbox noted that "the unstoppable voice and unquestionable talent of Whitney Houston will no doubt come roaring back onto the charts with this cover". Amy Linden of Entertainment Weekly said it "is artistically satisfying and uncharacteristically hip for the MOR songbird." John Martinucci of Gavin Report asserted that Houston "delivers a powerful rendition that reminds us of her natural abilities as a singer with or without musical accompaniment." Chris Willman of the Los Angeles Times commented that the singer "has the goods to deliver on the tune's haunting beauty and resists overpowering it – until the finale, when the key change and stratospheric notes drain all the heart-rending sadness out of the song and make it sound like just another anthem of survival." Stephen Holden of The New York Times called it a "magnificent rendition", commenting,Houston transforms a plaintive country ballad into a towering pop-gospel assertion of lasting devotion to a departing lover. Her voice breaking and tensing, she treats the song as a series of emotional bursts in a steady climb toward a final full-out declamation. Along the way, her virtuosic gospel embellishments enhance the emotion and never seem merely ornamental. Peter Stanton of Smash Hits commented, "A slow intro moulds into a crescendo of huggy-kissy-smoochiness that could melt the heart of the yeti of Northern Siberia." Writing for USA Today on November 17, 1992, James T. Jones IV labeled it a "tour-de-force", and added "[Houston] gives a 3-star [out of four] performance. Where Dolly Parton's original 'I Will Always Love You' was plaintive and tear-stained, Houston's is gospel-infused and dramatic."

Chart performance
The single spent 14 weeks at the top of the U.S. Billboard Hot 100, which at the time was a record. It became Houston's longest run atop the chart, surpassing her previous record of three weeks with "Greatest Love of All" in 1986. It is also the longest running number-one single from a soundtrack album.

It debuted at number 40 on the Billboard Hot 100, and became Houston's tenth number-one entry two weeks later. It also dominated other Billboard charts, spending 14 weeks at the top of the Billboard Hot 100 Single Sales chart, and 11 weeks at number one on its Hot 100 Airplay chart. The song remained at number one on the Mainstream Top 40 chart for nine consecutive weeks. It was Houston's first single on the chart and her first number one. The song also remained at number one for five weeks on the Hot Adult Contemporary Tracks, and for 11 weeks on the Hot R&B Singles chart becoming the longest running number one on the R&B charts at the time; it remained in the top 40 for 24 weeks. It became Arista Records' biggest hit. The song was number one on the Hot 100, Adult Contemporary, and R&B chart simultaneously for a record-equaling five weeks; Ray Charles' "I Can't Stop Loving You" in 1962 achieved the same feat on the same charts.

The song stayed at number one in the U.S. throughout January and February 1993, making it the first time Billboard did not rank a new number-one single until March of the new year. Houston's "I Will Always Love You" was also the year-end number one single of 1993 in the US. Similarly, in the UK, Houston's version was ranked the number-one single of 1992, and then made the countdown again in 1993 where it was ranked number nine, marking the first time any musical act had the same single ranked in the top ten of the year-end review two years in a row. In Australia, it was the number 17 single of 1992 and the number two song of 1993.

Houston's "I Will Always Love You" was also a massive international hit, topping the singles charts in almost every country, including the Eurochart Hot 100 Singles, where it spent 13 weeks at the top. The single ruled the summit position for ten weeks in Australia, five weeks in Austria, seven weeks for Belgium, eight weeks in France, six weeks in Germany, eight weeks in Ireland, six weeks in the Netherlands, fourteen weeks in New Zealand, nine weeks in Norway, one week in Spain and Uruguay, six weeks in Sweden, eight weeks in Switzerland, and ten weeks in the UK. The song reached the number one spot in the UK in 1992. Houston's ten-week reign in the UK was the longest run at the top by a solo female artist in the history of the British singles chart, until it was overtaken by Tones & I in 2019. It was the year-end number one song for in three countries – the U.S., Canada and the UK.

Houston's single sold approximately 400,000 copies in its second week at the top of the charts, making it the best-selling song in a single week surpassing Bryan Adams' "(Everything I Do) I Do It for You". It broke its own record in the following three weeks, peaking at 632,000 copies in the week ending on December 27, 1992. The January 9, 1993, issue of Billboard reported it had broken its own record for most copies sold in a single week for any song in the Nielsen SoundScan era. This record was broken by Elton John's "Candle in the Wind 1997/Something About the Way You Look Tonight", which sold 3.4 million in the final week of September 1997. "I Will Always Love You" was certified four times Platinum in the U.S. for shipments of over 4 million copies by the Recording Industry Association of America (RIAA) on January 12, 1993, making Houston the first female artist with a single to reach that level in RIAA history. According to Nielsen SoundScan, as of 2009, the single had sold 4,591,000 copies, and had become the second best-selling physical single in the US. On January 12, 2022, the single was certified Diamond by the RIAA for selling 10 million equivalent sales units from sales and streams, becoming the second-eldest song in history to do so after Queen's "Bohemian Rhapsody" and the third song overall in the 20th century to do so, preceded by "Bohemian Rhapsody" and Mariah Carey's 1994 Christmas single, "All I Want for Christmas is You". With this accomplishment, Houston became only the third female artist to have a diamond single and album after Carey and Taylor Swift.

In the UK, the single sold over 1,550,000 copies, becoming the tenth best-selling single of the 1990s, and was certified two times Platinum by the British Phonographic Industry (BPI) on January 1, 1993. In 1992 alone the single had sold 960,000 copies in United Kingdom. In 1993 the single sold 395,000 copies in United Kingdom. It was certified Platinum for shipments of over 500,000 copies by the Bundesverband Musikindustrie (BVMI) in Germany. In Japan, "I Will Always Love You" sold over 810,000 copies, staying for 27 weeks on the chart, and became the best-selling single by a foreign female artist at the time, despite not topping the charts.

Only a few hours after Houston's death on February 11, 2012, "I Will Always Love You" topped the U.S. iTunes charts. Also, in the week following her death, the single returned to the Billboard Hot 100 after almost twenty years, debuting at number seven, and becoming a posthumous top-ten single for Houston, the first one since 2001. The song eventually peaked at number three (two spots shy of repeating the feat achieved by Chubby Checker when "The Twist" returned to the top position after previously falling off the chart). It debuted on the Billboard Hot Digital Singles Chart at number three on the chart dated February 25, 2012, with over 195,000 copies downloaded. In the UK, the song charted at number ten the week of Houston's death.

Accolades
"I Will Always Love You" won the 1994 Grammy Awards for Record of the Year and Best Female Pop Vocal Performance, Houston's third win in the latter category after earlier wins in 1986 and 1988. During the Grammy Award telecast, the Best Pop Vocal Performance, Female award was presented to Houston by composer Dolly Parton and David Foster. The single topped the 1993 Billboard Hot 100 and Hot R&B Singles year-end charts simultaneously, becoming the first single by a female artist and the second overall to achieve that feat behind Prince's "When Doves Cry" in 1984. In addition, it received Favorite Pop/Rock Single and Favorite Soul/R&B Single awards at the 21st American Music Awards, which was the first record by a solo female artist to win both categories, and the third overall in AMA history behind "Endless Love" by Lionel Richie & Diana Ross in 1982 and "Beat It" by Michael Jackson in 1984. "I Will Always Love You" won two Japan Gold Disc Awards in 1993 for International Song of the Year, and a 1994 International Song of the Year Special Award for Japanese sales of over one million units.

In 2015, "I Will Always Love You" was named the No. 1 Song of the Rock Era in the book The Top 500 Songs of the Rock Era: 1955–2015.

In 2020, "I Will Always Love You" was selected by the Library of Congress for preservation in the National Recording Registry for being "culturally, historically, or aesthetically significant".

In 2021, "I Will Always Love You" was listed at number 94 on the updated list of Rolling Stone's 500 Greatest Songs of All Time.

Controversy
After Houston's recording became a hit in 1992, the tabloid press began reporting on a 'feud' between the two performers, stemming from Parton allegedly reneging on an agreement that she would not perform the song for a number of months while Houston's version was on the charts, so as not to compete with Houston's recording. However, both Parton and Houston dismissed any rumors, speaking glowingly of one another in interviews. Houston praised Parton for writing a beautiful song. In return, Parton thanked Houston for bringing her song to a wider audience and increasing the amount of royalties in the process. Parton also gave a live interview, confirming this.

When Houston won the Best Pop Vocal Performance, Female award at the 36th Annual Grammy Awards for her recording, Parton (along with David Foster) presented the award.

In a statement to Billboard mourning Houston's death in February 2012, Parton said:Mine is only one of the millions of hearts broken over the death of Whitney Houston. I will always be grateful and in awe of the wonderful performance she did on my song and I can truly say from the bottom of my heart, 'Whitney, I will always love you. You will be missed.'

Music video
The single's music video is credited to Alan Smithee (Nick Brandt removed his name due to the way Clive Davis re-edited the video), and produced by Rob Newman. It begins with the performance of the song Houston gives at the end of The Bodyguard. The video then cuts to the singer in a dark blue suit sitting in an empty theater with the spotlight shining on her, singing of her love, and when she starts her dramatic vocal finale, the theater changes into open camp surrounded by snow, which is meant to be at Fallen Leaf Lake, California, where The Bodyguards boat scene was filmed. The video is interspersed with scenes from the film and gives the viewer the experience of reliving the moments with Houston. At the time of the video's shooting the singer was pregnant with her daughter Bobbi Kristina, so she is shown only sitting in the theater scenes. On October 24, 2020, the video for "I Will Always Love You" reached one billion views on YouTube. It is the first music video of the 20th century by a solo artist to reach the milestone. Later in that year the 4k video was released.

Formats and track listings

UK and Europe 12-inch vinyl single
 A "I Will Always Love You" – 4:31
 B1 "Jesus Loves Me" – 5:11
 B2 "Do You Hear What I Hear?" – 3:31

UK, European, and U.S. 7-inch vinyl single
 A "I Will Always Love You" – 4:31
 B "Jesus Loves Me" – 5:11

US and Europe maxi-CD single
 "I Will Always Love You" – 4:31
 "Jesus Loves Me" – 5:11
 "Do You Hear What I Hear?" – 3:31

Maxi-CD singles (1999 remixes)
 "I Will Always Love You" (Hex Hector radio edit) – 4:50
 "I Will Always Love You" (Hex Hector 12-inch club mix) – 9:51
 "I Will Always Love You" (Hex Hector Anthem dub mix) – 5:44

Credits and personnel

 Performed by Whitney Houston
 Produced and arranged by David Foster
 Vocal arrangement – Whitney Houston
 Directed by Rickey Minor
 Keyboards – David Foster
 Sax solo – Kirk Whalum
 Drums – Ricky Lawson
 Percussion – Bashiri Johnson
 Guitars – Dean Parks, Michael Landau
 Bass – Neil Stubenhaus
 Synth programmers – Tony Smith, Claude Gaudette
 String arrangements – Ronn Huff
 Recording engineers – Bill Schnee, Dave Reitzas, Peter J. Yianilos
 Mixing engineer – Dave Reitzas
 Executive producers - Clive Davis, Whitney Houston

Charts

Weekly charts

Year-end charts

Decade-end charts

All-time charts

Billboard Magazine Hot 100 Anniversary Charts

Certifications and sales

Tributes
Jennifer Hudson performed the song in front of Houston, who received The BET Honors Award for Entertainer Lifetime Achievement spanning over 25 years in the industry. The 2010 BET Honors Awards was held at the Warner Theatre in Washington, D.C. and aired on February 1, 2010.
Since Houston's death in 2012, many other artists have performed tributes to the late singer's version of the song, including on February 12, 2012, when Hudson performed the song as a tribute during the 54th Annual Grammy Awards, the day after Houston's death, alongside images of musicians who had died in 2011 and 2012, including Amy Winehouse and Etta James. The song was played at Houston's funeral as her casket was brought out of the church. Parton complimented Hudson on her performance, saying,I was brought to tears again last night, as I'm sure many were, when Jennifer Hudson sang "I Will Always Love You" on the Grammys in memory of Whitney. Like everybody else, I am still in shock. But I know that Whitney will live forever in all the great music that she left behind. I will always have a very special piece of her in the song we shared together and had the good fortune to share with the world. Rest in peace, Whitney. Again, we will always love you.

The song title also served as the epitaph on Houston's gravestone.  In 2012, following Whitney Houston's death, American singer Beyoncé performed a tribute to Houston during her revue Revel Presents: Beyoncé Live in Atlantic City, New Jersey at the Revel resort. She began the performance of her song "Halo" singing the first verse of "I Will Always Love You" a cappella. Later, in 2013, during her The Mrs. Carter Show World Tour, Beyoncé also sang the opening lines of "I Will Always Love You" prior to the performance of "Halo" as the final song of the tour. At the 2017 Commencement of the University of Southern California, Will Ferrell sang "I Will Always Love You" to the graduating class.

Sarah Washington version

British singer Sarah Washington released a dance-cover of "I Will Always Love You" in August 1993. It became her highest-charting hit, reaching number three in Spain, number 12 in the UK, number 15 in Ireland, and number 32 in Sweden. On the Eurochart Hot 100, it peaked at number 44 in September 1993. It was released on Almighty Records, which described Washington as "an eager young hopeful" and cited her "sensational studio performance" as being key to the ultimate success of the track, also giving credit to London radio station 95.8 Capital FM and its heavy rotation of the song. A black-and-white music video was produced to promote the single. In 2006, Almighty Records released an 11-mixes package of "I Will Always Love You".

Critical reception
Larry Flick from Billboard commented, "There are no less than nine dance music covers of the Whitney Houston megahit "I Will Always Love You". So far, only Sarah Washington's hi-NRG rendering on Almighty Records is worth a spin." In his weekly UK chart commentary, James Masterton wrote, "If anything this new version adds a little more to the song, and at least proves it had genuine soul to start with. Top 10 for sure." Alan Jones from Music Week gave it four out of five, complimenting "a sinewy garage groove with a powerful vocal from the Donna Summer school of disco divas." James Hamilton from the RM Dance Update described it as a "I Will Survive-ish" remake.

Track listings
 CD single (Dance Mix), UK (1993)
"I Will Always Love You" (The Dolly Mix) – 6:20
"I Will Always Love You" (7" Edit) – 5:25
"I Will Always Love You" (Mighty Mix) – 7:26
"Body Heat" – 4:38

 CD single (Dance Mix), Scandinavia (1993)
"I Will Always Love You" (7" Edit) – 5:27
"I Will Always Love You" (12" Original Mix) – 7:27

 CD single (Dance Mix), Australia (1993)
"I Will Always Love You" (7" Edit)
"I Will Always Love You" (12" Original Mix)
"I Will Always Love You" (Luv'd Up Mix)
"Body Heat"

Charts

Rik Waller version
In 2002, English pop singer Rik Waller took his own version of "I Will Always Love You" into the top ten of the UK Singles Chart, peaking at number 6. It was his debut single and the first released from his debut studio album From Now..., after his taking part in the Pop Idol series.

Kristin Chenoweth version

"I Will Always Love You" was covered by American actress and singer Kristin Chenoweth as a duet with Dolly Parton. It was released on August 9, 2019, as the first single from Chenoweth's album, For the Girls.

Background
Chenoweth reflected on recording "I Will Always Love You" with ET Online, saying "it is a song I've loved since I was a child." She went on to say, "I used to think, 'One day I'm gonna sing that song.' Little did I know that I'd get to sing it with the queen herself."

"Forever Country"
The song found further chart success as part of the "Forever Country" medley, created in 2016 to celebrate the 50th anniversary of the Country Music Association Awards.  The medley also features "Take Me Home, Country Roads" and "On the Road Again".  Parton performs on the medley, along with 29 other country music artists.  The medley debuted at number one on the Billboard US Hot Country Songs chart and number 21 on the Billboard Hot 100 chart on October 8, 2016.

See also

 List of Australian number-one hits of 1993
 List of Austrian number-one hits of 1993
 List of number-one hits of 1993 (Belgium Flanders)
 List of RPM number-one singles of 1992
 List of RPM number-one singles of 1993
 Dutch Top 40 number-one hits of 1992
 Dutch Top 40 number-one hits of 1993
 List of European number-one hits of 1992
 List of European number-one hits of 1993
 List of French number-one hits of 1993
 Number-one hits of 1993 (Germany)
 List of number-one singles of 1992 (Ireland)
 List of number-one singles of 1993 (Ireland)
 List of number-one hits of 1992 (Italy)
 List of number-one singles in 1992 (New Zealand)
 List of number-one singles in 1993 (New Zealand)
 List of number-one songs in Norway
 List of number-one singles of 1993 (Spain)
 List of number-one singles and albums in Sweden
 List of number-one hits of 1993 (Switzerland)
 List of UK Singles Chart number ones of the 1990s
 List of number-one adult contemporary singles of 1992 (U.S.)
 List of number-one adult contemporary singles of 1993 (U.S.)
 List of Hot 100 Airplay number-one singles of the 1990s
 List of Billboard Mainstream Top 40 number-one songs of the 1990s
 List of Billboard Rhythmic number-one songs of the 1990s
 List of number-one R&B singles of 1992 (U.S.)
 R&B number-one hits of 1993 (USA)
 List of million-selling singles in the United Kingdom
 List of best-selling singles of the 1990s in the United Kingdom
 List of best-selling singles by year (UK)
 List of UK Singles Chart Christmas number ones
 List of UK top 10 singles in 1992
 List of best-selling singles in Australia
 List of Top 25 singles for 1992 in Australia
 List of Top 25 singles for 1993 in Australia
 Billboard Year-End Hot 100 singles of 1993
 List of Hot 100 number-one singles of the 1990s (U.S.)
 List of Billboard Hot 100 top 10 singles in 2012
 List of top 10 singles in 2012 (France)
 List of best-selling singles in Japan
 List of best-selling singles
 List of best-selling singles in the United States

References

External links
 
 

1973 songs
1974 singles
1982 singles
1992 singles
1993 debut singles
1995 singles
2002 debut singles
Dolly Parton songs
Vince Gill songs
Whitney Houston songs
Sarah Washington songs
Rik Waller songs
Kristin Chenoweth songs
Billboard Hot 100 number-one singles
Number-one singles in Australia
Number-one singles in Austria
Number-one singles in Belgium
Number-one singles in Denmark
RPM Top Singles number-one singles
European Hot 100 Singles number-one singles
SNEP Top Singles number-one singles
Number-one singles in Germany
Number-one singles in Iceland
Irish Singles Chart number-one singles
Oricon International Singles Chart number-one singles
Dutch Top 40 number-one singles
Number-one singles in New Zealand
Number-one singles in Norway
Number-one singles in Portugal
Number-one singles in Spain
Number-one singles in Sweden
Number-one singles in Switzerland
Number-one singles in Zimbabwe
UK Singles Chart number-one singles
Grammy Award for Record of the Year
Grammy Award for Best Female Pop Vocal Performance
Torch songs
Country ballads
Pop ballads
Contemporary R&B ballads
Songs written by Dolly Parton
RCA Victor singles
RCA Records Nashville singles
Columbia Nashville Records singles
ZYX Music singles
Music videos credited to Alan Smithee
Song recordings produced by Bob Ferguson (musician)
Song recordings produced by David Foster
Arista Records singles
1970s ballads
1990s ballads
Christmas number-one singles in the United Kingdom
United States National Recording Registry recordings